The Austral Picture Theatre was a theatre and cinema built in Collingwood, Victoria, Australia. It opened in 1921 as a theatre and later became a roller skate rink. It is currently used as a carpet store, with plans to partially demolish the building to make way for apartments.

History
The theatre was formally opened on Thursday, 15 September 1921, at 8pm, by the Mayor of Collingwood, Cr. Walter G. Amos. A jazz orchestra played music, and two films, Dady-Long-Legs and The Diamond Queen, were shown.

The building was owned by Winifred Kenny, and operated by Robert McLeish, who also leased several other theatres such as The Rivoli. By 1922 the business was reported as "booming", and the following year The Austral won second prize in a competition for lobby display, losing out to The Prince of Wales Theatre, Perth.

The Austral building was run as a cinema until at least the late 1930s, and had a partnership with Hoyt's Theatres. The cinema had one screen  and was said to seat 1600 patrons when it first opened, though this number appears to have fluctuated over the years, and was just over 1400 in 1953.

In 1953, Robert McLeish died, and on 29 July 1959 the cinema closed and was converted into the Austral Super Stall Market. Later in the 1970s the building was used as a roller skate rink, and in 1975 the building was placed for sale for $200,000. It was still available January the following year, and was then put up for auction in 1976, and again in 1988, and 1990. Since 2003 the Austral building has been the home of a carpet store Mr Carpets / Inner City Floorworld.

Recent Developments 
In 2019 Mr Carpets Floorworld sold the site for a reported $8 million to developer DPG who announced plans to turn the site into apartments. 

The new  building, designed by Jackson Clements Burrows Architects, was originally planned as an 11 storey apartment complex which would retain the original theatres facade, but would removed an remove an 80 year old Dutch elm tree from the rear of the property. These plans were met with considerable pushback from residents, but were tentatively approved by Yarra City Council in September 2021.

Although the building is considered "significant" by Heritage Victoria it is not protected.

References

External links 

 The Austral at Cinema Treasures

 The Austral at Heritage Victoria

1921 establishments in Australia
Cinemas in Melbourne
Culture of Melbourne
Former theatres in Melbourne
Organisations based in Melbourne
Theatres completed in 1921
Former cinemas